Flatfish is the second album, and debut studio recording, by Anglo-Irish celtic music group Flook, released in 1999 on Flatfish Records.

Track listing
 "Calico" - 3:26
 "E flat Reels" - 3:46
 "The Gentle Giant" - 6:40
 "Sligo Reel" - 4:13
 "Flatfish" - 7:32
 "Happy Jigs" - 3:20
 "Bruno" - 4:42
 "Waltzes" - 7:38
 "Flutopia" - 7:58

See also 
 Flook
 Celtic music

External links 
Flook

1999 debut albums
Flook (band) albums